The Saint John City Hall fire also known as the Saint John jail fire was a building fire which occurred in Saint John, New Brunswick's city lockup on June 21, 1977—which at that time was located on the ground floor of the Saint John City Hall. The fire, which had been started by prisoner John Kenney, killed 21 men who were trapped in confinement. The fire caused outrage as many of the people who were killed were jailed for offences that many deemed trivial. Further scorn was also directed at elements of the lockup's design such as padding in the cells which many claimed was highly flammable.

Victims 
Names of the victims include:

Daniel Lee Evoy, 25

John Coleman Guitar, 32

Robert Joseph O'Dell, 42

Donat Joseph Hachey (age unknown)

James Randolph Machum, 37

Robert William Goakery (age unknown)

Edward Henry Mitchell, 39

David Patrick Cyr, 28

Timothy Lionel Albert, 17

Robert George Voutour, 19

Gary Francis Janes, 25

Timothy Kenneth Milne, 17

Michael Anthony Blizzard, 17

Robert Lewis Barton, 18

Wayne Douglas Matheson, 29

Frank Creighton Smith (age unknown)

Russell Shaw (age unknown)

Gerald E. Williams (age unknown)

Ivan Donnally (age unknown)

Walter James Whipple (age unknown)

James (Jimmy) Phillips, 17, from Topsfield, Maine

References 

1977 crimes in Canada
1977 fires in North America
1977 in New Brunswick
Arson in Canada
Building and structure fires in Canada
Disasters in New Brunswick
History of Saint John, New Brunswick
June 1977 events in Canada
Mass murder in Canada